Virginia's 100th House of Delegates district elects one of the 100 members of the Virginia House of Delegates, the lower house of the state's bicameral legislature. District 100 is located on the Eastern Shore of Virginia and includes parts of Norfolk City, Accomack County and Northampton County, Virginia. Since 2014, the district has been represented by Republican Robert Bloxom Jr.

List of delegates

References

External links
 

Virginia House of Delegates districts
Norfolk, Virginia
Virginia Beach, Virginia
Accomack County, Virginia
Northampton County, Virginia